Epaphius castificus is a species of ground beetle in the family Carabidae. It is found in China.

Subspecies
These two subspecies belong to the species Epaphius castificus:
 Epaphius castificus castificus P.Moravec & Wrase, 1998  (China)
 Epaphius castificus taibaicola Deuve, 2001  (China)

References

Trechinae